Benson & Forsyth is a British architectural partnership, whose principal architects are Gordon Benson and Alan Forsyth.  Their offices are in Islington, London, although they formerly also had a small office in Edinburgh.  They were nominated for the Stirling Prize in 1999 and 2002 for the Museum of Scotland and National Gallery of Ireland respectively.  Their work is heavily influenced by that of Le Corbusier, but they are also interested in trying to create a more contextual form of modern architecture.

Major projects

Completed
 Museum of Scotland, Edinburgh
 National Gallery of Ireland Millennium Wing, Dublin
 Gabriel Square, St Albans
 Nova Victoria, London. High end residential apartments and retail

Proposed
 Housing at The Power Station London.  (Status of project uncertain as of February 2007) 
 Beamish Museum visitor centre, won in competition June 2006 
 City North project at Finsbury Park Station (£40 million build value).

Unbuilt
 Royal College of Surgeons of Edinburgh
 Edinburgh Central Library extension

References

External links
 

Architecture firms based in London